Battle of Koyun Islands was a medieval naval engagement in the Aegean Sea. The theatre of the battle was around Koyun Islands (Oinousses) which are a group of small islands between the island of Chios and Anatolia. The belligerents were the Beylik of İzmir and the Byzantine Empire.

Beylik of İzmir (or beylik of Chaka) was founded by a Turkish seaman named Chaka Bey in the 11 the century. Although not a member of the Seljuk house, his daughter was married to Kılıç Arslan I of the Seljuks of Anatolia. He founded a maritime beylik (principality) around İzmir and he frequently campaigned on the Byzantine islands in east Aegean sea.

After capturing the island of Lesbos, he planned to attack the island of Chios. There were 17 war ships and 33 clippers under his command. However upon learning about an approaching Byzantine fleet under the command of Niketa Kastamonita, he decided to fight. The battle on the 19 May 1090 continued until night. Chaka was able to defeat the Byzantine fleet.

After the battle Chaka annexed the islands of Chios and Samos.

References

Aegean Sea
1090
Anatolian beyliks
Naval battles involving the Byzantine Empire
Battles involving the Seljuk Empire